Adam Stewart may refer to:

Adam Steuart or Stewart, Scottish philosopher and controversialist
Adam Stewart (business executive), Jamaican businessman
Adam Stewart (cyclist) (born 1987), New Zealand track cyclist